Colour All My Days is the second solo album by the English singer Limahl, released on EMI Records in 1986.

Overview
Following the international success of "The NeverEnding Story", the main theme to the film of the same name, in 1986, Limahl's second album was mostly produced by Giorgio Moroder (except for a couple of tracks, by Derek Nakamoto), who already produced the former smash hit. Moroder also provided the music to seven out of the ten tracks on the album, while Limahl himself wrote all but one of the lyrics (he also co-wrote the music for two tracks and played keyboard on two other tracks). The only track he did not actually contribute to was "Inside to Outside", the second single taken from the album, which was written by Colin Pearson and Achim Opperman. Though this song was a complete commercial flop for Limahl (it was actually released twice, the second time in a more spirited remixed version), it would later become a hit for dance vocalist Lady Violet.

The album failed to chart in the UK. The first single, "Love In Your Eyes", reached No.80 in the UK Singles Chart, (his final chart entry there). The song fared  better in continental Europe, in particular in German-speaking countries (it went to Number 28 in Germany itself), and in Italy, where it peaked at No.22 (his second highest charting single there). The title track was released as a third single in Spain, and Limahl recorded a Spanish-language version of the song entitled "No Lo Pienses Más" (meaning "Don't Think About It Anymore"). "Don't Send For Me" was released in the Netherlands as the final single from the album.

The album was never released on CD, but the first eight songs were digitally remastered by Disky Records for the 1996 compilation The Best of Limahl. A reduced version of this digital compilation was released in 2002, again on the Disky label, entitled Neverending Story-Best of Limahl, and included seven tracks from the original album. The whole album appeared as part of Warner Music's Original Albums Series in 2014 along with Limahl's first album, Don't Suppose, and the three Kajagoogoo albums in a budget priced boxed set.

Critical reception
Smash Hits magazine gave the album a highly negative review, awarded it a rare zero out of ten and stating that "This album is all that is dull, completely without imagination, and sickeningly bland in the world of popular music..."

Track listing
All lyrics written by Limahl; all music composed by Giorgio Moroder; except where noted.
"Love in Your Eyes" – 4:18 
"Colour All My Days" – 4:46 
"Nothing on Earth (Can Keep Me from You)" (lyrics: Limahl, Billy Griffin; music: Limahl, Billy Griffin Derek Nakamoto) - 3:50
"Tonight Will Be the Night" (lyrics: Limahl; music: Limahl, Glen Grayson) - 4:10
"Working Out" – 4:16 
"Don't Send for Me" – 3:37
"Shock" – 4:38 
"Inside to Outside" (lyrics: Colin Pearson, Achim Opperman; music: Achim Opperman) - 3:41
"Love Will Tear the Soul" – 3:30 
"For My Heart's Sake" – 4:00

Singles from the album
"Love in Your Eyes"/"Love Will Tear the Soul" (UK #80, Italy #22, Germany #28)
"Inside to Outside"/"Shock"
"Inside to Outside (Remix)"/"Shock" (Germany #57)
"Colour All My Days"/"Love Will Tear the Soul" (only released in Spain)
"No Lo Pienses Más"/"Colour All My Days" (A side: Spanish version of "Colour All My Days" - only released in Spain)
"Don't Send For Me"/"Colour All My Days"

Personnel
Band
Limahl - lead and background vocals; remix and additional keyboards on #3 and #4
Giorgio Moroder - production; background vocals; keyboards
Charly Hörnemann - guitars
Derek Nakamoto - keyboards, programming and production on #3 and #4
Freddie Santiago - percussion on #3
Dino Solera - saxophone
Laszlo Szűcs (Bencker) - keyboards and programming
Donald Griffin - guitars on #3
Tony Buchanan - saxophone on #3
Judy Cheeks, Victoria Miles - backing vocals
Venetta Fields, Sherlie Matthews, Billy Griffin, Michael Hamm - backing vocals #3

Production
Brian Reeves - engineer; remix (except #5)
Hans Menzel - engineer and mix-down
Zeke Lund - engineer on #3 and #4
Jürgen Koppers - mix on #3 and #4
Harry Schnitzler - remix #3 and #4

Staff
Bill Smith Studio - cover art
Johnny Rozsa - photography
Michael John - hairdresser
Kinji @ Toshiba Japan, Simon G. Smith @ EMI London - help with Yamaha
Peter Ikin - special collaboration in Sydney, Australia
Martin - collaboration at 301 Studios
Gaff Management (Billy Gaff) - management
Riva Music - publishers

References

External links
 Colour All My Days album
 Limahl Official British Website (in English)
 KajaFax - The Officially Approved Limahl & Kajagoogoo Community & Fan Club
 Unofficial Limahl & Kajagoogoo YouTube video archives

1986 albums
Limahl albums
Albums produced by Giorgio Moroder
EMI Records albums